Ralph D. Acosta (born September 28, 1934) is a former Democratic member of the Pennsylvania House of Representatives. He was the first Latino to be elected to the state House.

Background
Born in Sabana Grande, Puerto Rico on September 28, 1934, Acosta was professionally involved in long-haul trucking.

Political career
A Democrat, he was elected to the Pennsylvania House of Representatives for the 1985 term. The first Latino to be elected to the state House, he served a total of five consecutive terms. In 1995, he ran an unsuccessful campaign for reelection. During his tenure, Acosta was appointed as one of two vice chairs of the Pennsylvania Governor's Advisory Commission on Latino Affairs, serving under Governor Robert P. Casey. One of the concerns on which he focused was safe, affordable housing for senior citizens.

Acosta was succeeded by Benjamin Ramos.

References

American politicians of Puerto Rican descent
Hispanic and Latino American people in Pennsylvania politics
Hispanic and Latino American state legislators in Pennsylvania
Democratic Party members of the Pennsylvania House of Representatives
People from Sabana Grande, Puerto Rico
Living people
1934 births